is a platforming video game and the second Bomberman game for the Nintendo 64. It was originally planned as a Bonk/PC Kid game known as  Ultra Genjin, but became a Bomberman game during development. 

A further departure from the 16-bit Bomberman titles after Bomberman 64, it gives Bomberman more character moves, and has more levels, bosses, and weapons. However, in a break from the Bomberman series formula, it lacks a multiplayer mode. This game was released on the Wii Virtual Console service.

Story
A princess steals a secret data disk from an evil empire, and she safely smuggles out the information through a robot, but is captured herself. Bomberman is training in his headquarters when news arrives about the princess being captured. Bomberman chases after the Garaden Empire to save the Princess, but the Empire claims back the disks to rebuild their leader, Bagular, whose body was destroyed in Super Bomberman 3.

Bomberman travels through four worlds: Planet Bomber, Primus Star, Kanatia Star, and Mazone Star. Towards the middle of a world Bomberman encounters Nitros, a mysterious recurring mini-boss similar to Bomberman. For the first three worlds, Bomberman chases after Princess Millian only to find that she has been transported to the next world. While on Mazone area three, Bomberman finds Princess Millian safe in a laboratory. She tells him to find the rest of the disks. After giving the disks to Princess Millian, she turns out to be Natia in disguise. Natia sends the disks needed to rebuild Bagular to the Garaden base. After Bomberman battles Natia and Cronus, he sets out towards Garaden Star.

Within Garaden Star, Bomberman encounters Nitros. After a battle, Nitros snaps out of his brain-washed state, explains himself to Bomberman, shares his power with Bomberman, and tells him to defeat Bagular for him. Bomberman encounters the recently resurrected Bagular and engages him in battle. As a final act of desperation, Bagular self-destructs Garaden Star in an attempt to kill Bomberman.

If a perfect score is achieved on every level and all the Adok bombs are collected, a new cut-scene takes place after the destruction of Garaden Star. A mysterious figure says "Bagular you fool, you lost again!" and the final world, Gossick Star, appears. There Bomberman battles Evil Bomber, believing him to be the real mastermind of the operation. After defeating Evil Bomber, Bomberman flies away in a ship with Princess Millian.

Gameplay
Bomberman Hero controls very differently from Bomberman 64. In Hero, the character can jump, has a life meter, faces tougher bosses, and has the ability to throw bombs farther, thus, making Hero a more platform-oriented experience. There are several different areas to be encountered, each with about five different stages. A unique feature is that it's possible to play with an extra advancement, such as a jet pack or a submarine.

There are also several different types of bombs in addition to the regular ones. Ice bombs turn enemies into a block of ice which can be moved around and used to jump on to get to higher places. Salt bombs only harm slugs, which are invulnerable to all other weapons. Control bombs explode when remotely detonated; a useful ability against certain bosses.

Much of the game's replay value is in the sub-mission of scoring the number of target points per stage, which awards Bomberman a certain number of stage points (1 through 5) at the end of each level.  You can re-enter the stages as often as you like, in order to secure the highest possible score within the stage.  Medals are awarded on a per-planet basis, awarded based on the total number of stage points at the planet's completion (red, blue, bronze, silver, and gold).  Getting a perfect score on every planet (or rather, a gold medal on each one) will award mini-games to be accessed on the options screen.  The games include:

Slide Racer: Play through the Crystal Hole level on the Bomber Slider, racing against a snow-man.  Beat him and get the record time to win.
Golden Bomber: Bomberman gets the Golden Chip, which allows him to travel underwater with ease. Traverse through three stages to beat the Boss of the Woods.
Treasure Hunt: Princess Millian's ship, which was full of treasure taken from Bagular's base, was shot down at the treasures were scattered all over the six planets. Find them all.

Development 

June Chikuma composed the game's soundtrack in the genres of drum and bass and acid techno.

Reception

Bomberman Hero received generally mixed reviews. GameSpot said, "Despite the uninspired plotline, Bomberman Hero is a rather surprising success. In a departure from Bomberman 64, Bomberman Hero boasts a number of new gameplay features that make this a completely new Bomberman game." In a mixed review, IGN heavily criticized the lack of multiplayer mode, stating, "Nintendo and Hudson serve up a decidedly average 3D Bomberman sequel -- without a multiplayer mode."

Edge criticized the graphics for featuring intrusive distance fog and the same texture pattern, which make it difficult for the player to judge depth. However, the magazine concluded that, as a Japanese platformer, the game should not be overlooked, and favorably compared its rewarding exploration with that of Yoshi's Island. The game had a page on the official Nintendo 64 website, and on the right of the page, there is a Nintendo Player's Choice: Million Sellers sticker, implying the game sold over a million copies.

References

1998 video games
3D platform games
Hero
Hudson Soft games
Nintendo 64 games
Nintendo games
Video games developed in Japan
Video games scored by Jun Chikuma
Virtual Console games
Single-player video games
Platform games